The North Carolina's 13th congressional district was re-established in 2002 after the state gained population in the 2000 United States census. Previously, the state had 13 districts from the first election following the 1810 census until the reapportionment following the 1840 census.

The thirteenth district is currently represented by Wiley Nickel.

History 
From 2003 to 2013, the district included all of Person and Caswell Counties; as well as parts of Alamance, Granville, Guilford, Rockingham, and Wake Counties. However, reapportionment after the 2010 census shifted the district more to the south and east. As a result, it lost its share of Alamance, Caswell, Guilford, Person, and Rockingham Counties. In the place of those five counties, portions of Durham, Edgecombe, Franklin, Nash, Vance, Wayne, and Wilson Counties were added. Less of Granville County and more of Wake County were also included. While Barack Obama carried the old 13th with 59 percent of the vote in 2008, John McCain would have won it with 54 percent of the vote had it existed under the new lines.

As a result, Democratic Congressman Brad Miller, who represented the district from its creation in 2003, announced he would not seek re-election to office in 2012. From 2013 to 2017, the district was represented by Republican George Holding.

After mid-decade redistricting, most of the old 13th district was essentially merged with the old 2nd district. A new 13th district was created, stretching from the northern suburbs of Charlotte to Greensboro. Republican Ted Budd became the first congressman from this new district.

In 2021, a new 13th district was created that included counties west of Charlotte. While North Carolina Speaker of the House Tim Moore was expected to run for the seat, he said he would not after Madison Cawthorn announced his candidacy.

In 2022, the North Carolina Supreme Court rejected the redrawn districts, later approving a new map in which the 13th district included Johnston County and parts of Harnett, Wake, and Wayne Counties in the Raleigh area.

Counties 
Counties in the 2023-2025 district map.
 Harnett County (part)
 Johnston County
 Wake County (part)
 Wayne County (part)

Presidential electoral history

List of members representing the district

Election results

2002

2004

2006

2008

2010

2012

2014

2016

2018

2020

2022

See also 

 North Carolina's congressional districts
 List of United States congressional districts

Notes

References

 Congressional Biographical Directory of the United States 1774–present

13
Constituencies established in 2003
2003 establishments in North Carolina